Manistique is the only city and county seat of Schoolcraft County in the U.S. state of Michigan.  As of the 2020 census, the city population was 2,828.

The city borders the adjacent Manistique Township, but the two are administered independently.  The city lies on the north shore of Lake Michigan at the mouth of the Manistique River, which forms a natural harbor that has been improved with breakwaters, dredging, and the Manistique East Breakwater Light.  The city is named after the river.   The economy depends heavily on tourism from Lake Michigan, as well as nearby Indian Lake State Park and Palms Book State Park.

History

Originally named Eastport, Manistique replaced Onota as the county seat. Eastport was the name of the post office, but was not used for the community. Manistique was incorporated as a village in 1883 and as a city in 1901 by the state legislature. With the river originally spelled Monistique, a spelling error in the city charter led to its current spelling.

Nickname 
Manistique is nicknamed "The Emerald City." It is believed to be named for the emerald green waters of the nearby Kitch-iti-kipi spring, the largest spring in the state of Michigan. The Manistique Area Schools athletic teams are referred to as the "Emeralds." Several local businesses include "Emerald City" in their names.

Geography

Climate
This climatic region is typified by large seasonal temperature differences, with warm to hot (and often humid) summers and cold (sometimes severely cold) winters.  According to the Köppen Climate Classification system, Manistique has a humid continental climate, abbreviated "Dfb" on climate maps.

Demographics

2020 census
As of the census of 2020, there were 2,828 people, 1,193 households, and 702 families residing in the city. The racial makeup of the city was 81.9% White, 0.2% African American, 9.7% Native American, 1.5% Asian, 0.1% from other races, and 3.9% from two or more races. Hispanic or Latino of any race were 1.0% of the population.

There were 1,193 households, of which 27.9% had children under the age of 18 living with them, 37.5% were married couples living together, 12.6% had a female householder with no husband present, 5.3% had a male householder with no wife present, and 44.7% were non-families. 40.3% of all households were made up of individuals, and 20.3% had someone living alone who was 65 years of age or older. The average household size was 2.15 and the average family size was 2.87.

The median age in the city was 43 years. 23% of residents were under the age of 18; 7.3% were between the ages of 18 and 24; 22.4% were from 25 to 44; 26.6% were from 45 to 64; and 20.6% were 65 years of age or older. The gender makeup of the city was 46.3% male and 53.7% female.

Infrastructure

Transportation

Indian Trails provides daily intercity bus service between St. Ignace and Ironwood, Michigan.
 Manistique is serviced by the Schoolcraft County Airport (KISQ)

Images

References

Cities in Schoolcraft County, Michigan
County seats in Michigan
Michigan populated places on Lake Michigan
Populated places established in 1883
1883 establishments in Michigan